Shahrak-e Shahid Rezavani-ye Lakben (also Romanized as Shahrak-e Shahīd Rez̤avānī-ye Lakben) is a village in Lahijan-e Sharqi Rural District, Lajan District, Piranshahr County, West Azerbaijan Province, Iran. At the 2006 census, its population was 55, in 9 families.

References 

Populated places in Piranshahr County